Analetris is a genus of sand-dwelling mayflies in the family Acanthametropodidae. There are at least two described species in Analetris.

Species
These two species belong to the genus Analetris:
 Analetris eximia Edmunds, 1972
 † Analetris secundus Godunko & Klonowska-Olejnik, 2006

References

Further reading

 
 

Mayflies
Articles created by Qbugbot